Valeri Timofeev (1941–2014) was a Latvian artist. His works are being collected by Walters Art Museum, Smithsonian American Art Museum and Dallas Museum of Art.

Early life and career 
The artist moved to Russia in 1967 to pursue his interest and further education in arts. In 1993, he moved to the United States where his exhibits have garnered national praise.

References

Latvian artists
1941 births
Living people